Sportsman Airpark  is a public airport located one mile (1.6 km) southeast of Newberg in Yamhill County, Oregon, United States.

External links
City of Newberg Transportation website

Airports in Yamhill County, Oregon
Buildings and structures in Newberg, Oregon